White Gum Valley is a suburb of Perth, Western Australia located within the City of Fremantle. It is situated behind the main ridge that lies east of Fremantle.

Name
There are no records of the origins of the name.

Geography
White Gum Valley is bordered by South Street to the south, Carrington Street to the east, Stevens Street to the north and Edmund Street to the west.

Street names
Several of the streets in the White Gum Valley are named for pioneering families in the area, such as Samson Street named after Sir Frederick Samson. Most of the streets running north-to-south are named after towns and localities in the Murchison and Mid West regions of Western Australia: Yilgarn Street, Wiluna Street, Nannine Avenue, Yalgoo Avenue, Wongan Avenue, and Minilya Avenue.

Parks and reserves
Two parks and reserves are located in the suburb of White Gum Valley: Davies Reserve in the west of the suburb, and Valley Park in the centre of the suburb. The Royal Fremantle Golf Club (Inc.) and Fremantle Golf Course are located to the north of the suburb, in Fremantle.

Schools
White Gum Valley Primary School is located in the west of the suburb. Kim Beazley School, formerly used by special education students, was shut in 2008. The former school was demolished in 2011 to make way for residential development.

References

External links
 

Suburbs of Perth, Western Australia
Suburbs in the City of Fremantle